The Women's individual event of the Biathlon World Championships 2015 was held on 11 March 2015.

Results
The race was started at 18:15 EET.

References

Women's individual
2015 in Finnish women's sport